Lewis Carroll published "The Alphabet-Cipher" in 1868, possibly in a children's magazine.  It describes what is known as a Vigenère cipher, a well-known scheme in cryptography. While Carroll calls this cipher "unbreakable," Kasiski had already published in 1863 a volume describing how to break such ciphers and Charles Babbage had secretly found ways to break polyalphabetic ciphers in the previous decade during the Crimean War.

The piece begins with a tabula recta.

"The Alphabet-Cipher", Lewis Carroll, 1869
    ABCDEFGHIJKLMNOPQRSTUVWXYZ
   abcdefghijklmnopqrstuvwxyz A
  B bcdefghijklmnopqrstuvwxyza B
  C cdefghijklmnopqrstuvwxyzab C
  D defghijklmnopqrstuvwxyzabc D
  E efghijklmnopqrstuvwxyzabcd E
  F fghijklmnopqrstuvwxyzabcde F
  G ghijklmnopqrstuvwxyzabcdef G
  H hijklmnopqrstuvwxyzabcdefg H
  I ijklmnopqrstuvwxyzabcdefgh I
  J jklmnopqrstuvwxyzabcdefghi J
  K klmnopqrstuvwxyzabcdefghij K
  L lmnopqrstuvwxyzabcdefghijk L
  M mnopqrstuvwxyzabcdefghijkl M
  N nopqrstuvwxyzabcdefghijklm N
  O opqrstuvwxyzabcdefghijklmn O
  P pqrstuvwxyzabcdefghijklmno P
  Q qrstuvwxyzabcdefghijklmnop Q
  R rstuvwxyzabcdefghijklmnopq R
  S stuvwxyzabcdefghijklmnopqr S
  T tuvwxyzabcdefghijklmnopqrs T
  U uvwxyzabcdefghijklmnopqrst U
  V vwxyzabcdefghijklmnopqrstu V
  W wxyzabcdefghijklmnopqrstuv W
  X xyzabcdefghijklmnopqrstuvw X
  Y yzabcdefghijklmnopqrstuvwx Y
  Z zabcdefghijklmnopqrstuvwxy Z
    ABCDEFGHIJKLMNOPQRSTUVWXYZ

Explanation
Each column of this table forms a dictionary of symbols representing the
alphabet: thus, in the A column, the symbol is the same as the letter
represented; in the B column, A is represented by B, B by C, and so on.

To use the table, some word or sentence should be agreed on by two
correspondents. This may be called the 'key-word', or 'key-sentence',
and should be carried in the memory only.

In sending a message, write the key-word over it, letter for letter,
repeating it as often as may be necessary: the letters of the key-word
will indicate which column is to be used in translating each letter of
the message, the symbols for which should be written underneath: then
copy out the symbols only, and destroy the first paper. It will now be
impossible for anyone, ignorant of the key-word, to decipher the message,
even with the help of the table.

For example, let the key-word be vigilance, and the message 'meet me on
Tuesday evening at seven', the first paper will read as follows—
 
 v i g i l a n c e v i g i l a n c e v i g i l a n c e v i
 m e e t m e o n t u e s d a y e v e n i n g a t s e v e n
 h m k b x e b p x p m y l l y r x i i q t o l t f g z z v

The second will contain only 'h m k b x e b p x p m y l l y r x i i q t o l t f g z z v'.

The receiver of the message can, by the same process, retranslate it
into English.

If this table is lost, it can easily be written out from memory, by observing that the first symbol in each column is the same as the letter naming the column, and that they are continued downwards in alphabetical order. It would only be necessary to write out the particular columns required by the key-word, but such a paper would afford an adversary the means for discovering the key-word.

For a working demonstration tool for the Alphabet Cipher visit lewiscarrollresources.net

History of cryptography
Classical ciphers